Chess is played all over the world. The international governing body of chess is FIDE, established in 1924. Most national chess federations are now members of FIDE; several supranational chess organizations are also affiliated with FIDE.

National level: Current FIDE members
The table below lists the member federations of FIDE and their national championship. The number of grandmasters and players registered for each federation in the FIDE database as of September 2016 are also indicated.

{| class="sortable wikitable"
! Country !! Zone !! National federation !! #GM !! #FIDE !! National championship
|-
|  ||  3.4 || Afghan National Chess Federation || 0 || 197 || Afghan Chess Championship
|-
|  || 1.5a ||    || 1 || 507 || Albanian Chess Championship
|-
|  || 4.1 ||    || 2 || 3295 || Algerian Chess Championship
|-
|  || 1.10 ||    || 2 || 146 || Andorran Chess Championship
|-
|  || 4.3 ||   || 0 || 995 || Angolan Chess Championship
|-
|  || 2.3.5 || Antigua and Barbuda Chess Federation || 0 || 15 || –
|-
|  || 2.5 || Argentine Chess Federation   || 23 || 8982 || Argentine Chess Championship
|-
|  || 1.5b || Armenian Chess Federation   || 39 || 1124 || Armenian Chess Championship
|-
|  || 2.3.5 || Federashon di Ajedrez di Aruba  || 0 || 42 || –
|-
|  || 3.6 || Australian Chess Federation   || 8 || 2001 || Australian Chess Championship
|-
|  || 1.2a || Österreichischer Schachbund   || 9 || 3561 || Austrian Chess Championship
|-
|  || 1.8 || Azerbaijan Chess Federation  || 23 || 1701 || Azerbaijani Chess Championship
|-
|  || 2.3.5 || Bahamas Chess Federation   || 0 || 34 || Bahamian Chess Championship
|-
|  || 3.1 || Bahrain Mind Sports Association || 0 || 53 || Bahraini Chess Championship
|-
|  || 3.2 || Bangladesh Chess Federation   || 5 || 1322 || Bangladeshi Chess Championship
|-
|  || 2.3.5 || Barbados Chess Federation   || 0 || 138 || Barbadian Chess Championship
|-
|  || 1.8 || Belarus Chess Federation   || 16 || 1048 || Belarusian Chess Championship
|-
|  || 1.1b ||    || 9 || 3039 || Belgian Chess Championship
|-
|  || 2.3.5 || Bermuda Chess Association  || 0 || 68 || –
|-
|  || 3.2 || Bhutan Chess Federation || 0 || 7 || Bhutan National Premier Chess Championship
|-
|  || 2.4 || Federación Boliviana de Ajedrez   || 1 || 1043 || Bolivian Chess Championship
|-
|  || 1.2b || Sahovski Savez Bosne i Hercegovine   || 8 || 875 || Bosnia and Herzegovina Chess Championship
|-
|  || 4.3 ||  || 0 || 392 || Botswana Chess Championship
|-
|  || 2.4 || Confed. Brasileira de Xadrez   || 14 || 4,943 || Brazilian Chess Championship
|-
|  || 2.3.5 || British Virgin Islands Chess Federation || 0 || 4 || –
|-
|  || 3.3 || Brunei Chess Federation  || 0 || 79 || Brunei Chess Championship
|-
|  || 1.4 || Bulgarian Chess Federation  || 31 || 1779 || Bulgarian Chess Championship 
|-
|  || 4.4 || Comité National Burkinabé des Échecs || 0 || 15 || Burkinabé Chess Championship
|-
|  || 4.2 ||  || 0 || 11 || Burundian Chess Championship
|-
|  || 3.3 || Cambodian Chess Federation || 0 || 2 || Cambodian Chess Championship 
|-
|  || 4.4 ||   || 0 || 16 || Cameroonian Chess Championship
|-
|  || 2.2 || Chess Federation of Canada   || 14 || 1605 || Canadian Chess Championship 
|-
|  || 4.4 ||  || 0 || 22 || Cape Verdean Chess Championship
|-
|  || 4.4 || Chess Federation of Central African Republic || 0 || 4 || Central African Chess Championship 
|-
|  || 2.5 || Fed. Deportiva Nacional De Ajedrez  || 5 || 2140 || Chilean Chess Championship
|-
|  || 3.5 || Chinese Chess Association   || 43 || 1445 || Chinese Chess Championship
|-
|  || 3.3 || Chinese Taipei Chess Association   || 0 || 120 || Taiwanese Chess Championship
|-
|  || 2.3.4 || Fed. Colombiana de Ajedrez   || 7 || 2559 || Colombian Chess Championship
|-
|  || 4.3 ||  || 0 || 0 || Comorian Chess Championship 
|-
|  || 4.3 ||  || 0 || 7 || Congolese Chess Championship 
|-
|  || 2.3.2 || Federacion Central de Ajedrez   || 1 || 653 || Costa Rican Chess Championship
|-
|  || 1.2b || Hrvatski šahovski savez   || 29 || 3135 || Croatian Chess Championship 
|-
|  || 2.3.3 || Fed. Cubana de Ajedrez || 24 || 2033 || Cuban Chess Championship
|-
|  || 1.10 || Cyprus Chess Federation  || 0 || 134 || Cypriot Chess Championship
|-
|  || 1.4 || Šachový svaz České republiky   || 35 || 7539 || Czech Chess Championship 
|-
|  || 1.3 || Dansk Skak Union   || 11 || 3880 || Danish Chess Championship
|-
|  || 4.2 || Djiboutian Chess Federation || 0 || 8 || Djiboutian Chess Championship
|-
|  || 2.3.5 || Federación Dominicana de Ajedrez   || 1 || 657 || Dominican Chess Championship
|-
|  || 2.3.5 || Fed. Ecuatoriana de Ajedrez   || 1 || 1208 || Ecuadorian Chess Championship
|-
|  || 4.2 || Egyptian Chess Federation || 5 || 2026 || Egyptian Chess Championship
|-
|  || 1.1a || English Chess Federation   || 36 || 3390 || British Chess Championship
|-
|  || 2.3.2 || Federación Salvadoreña de Ajedrez   || 0 || 294 || Salvadoran Chess Championship
|-
|  || 4.2 || Eritrea Chess Federation || 0 || 6 || Eritrean Chess Championship
|-
|  || 1.7 || Eesti Maleliit   || 6 || 425 || Estonian Chess Championship
|-
|  || 4.2 || Ethiopian Chess Federation  || 0 || 77 || Ethiopian Chess Championship
|-
|  || 1.10 || Talvsamband Foroya   || 1 || 165 || Faroese Chess Championship
|-
|  || 3.6 || Fiji Chess Federation   || 0 || 43 || Fijian Chess Championship
|-
|  || 1.3 || Suomen Keskusshakkiliitto   || 5 || 1045 || Finnish Chess Championship
|-
|  || 1.1b || French Chess Federation   || 50 || 22,351 || French Chess Championship
|-
|  || 4.4 || Fédération Gabonaise des Échecs  || 0 || 3 || Gabonese Chess Championship
|-
|  || 4.4 || Gambia Chess Federation  || 0 || 9 || Gambian Chess Championship
|-
|  || 1.5b || Chess Federation of Georgia  || 31 || 1163 || Georgian Chess Championship
|-
|  || 1.2a || Deutscher Schachbund   || 92 || 25,470 || German Chess Championship
|-
|  || 4.4 ||    || 0 || 66 || Ghanaian Chess Championship
|-
|  || 1.5a || Elliniki Skakistiki Omospondia   || 13 || 5497 || Greek Chess Championship
|-
|  || 3.6 || Guam Chess Federation || 0 || 28 || –
|-
|  || 2.3.2 || Fed. Nac. de Ajedrez de Guatemala  || 0 || 235 || Guatemalan Chess Championship
|-
|  || 1.10 || Guernsey Chess Federation  || 0 || 25 || Guernsey Chess Championship
|-
|  || 2.3.5 || Guyana Chess Federation || 0 || 29 || Guyanese Chess Championship
|-
|  || 2.3.5 || Haitian Chess Federation || 0 || 12 || Haitian Chess Championship
|-
|  || 2.3.2 || Federación Nacional de Ajedrez de Honduras  || 0 || 192 || Honduran Chess Championship
|-
|  || 3.3 || Hong Kong Chess Federation || 0 || 258 || Hong Kong Chess Championship
|-
|  || 1.4 || Magyar Sakkszovetseg   || 48 || 6229 || Hungarian Chess Championship
|-
|  || 1.3 || Skáksamband Íslands   || 13 || 600 || Icelandic Chess Championship
|-
|  || 3.7 || All India Chess Federation   || 52 || 30,609 || Indian Chess Championship
|-
|  || 3.3 || Persatuan Catur Seluruh Indonesia   || 3 || 808 || Indonesian Chess Championship
|-
|  || 3.1 || Chess Fed. of Islamic Rep. of Iran   || 15 || 9502 || Iranian Chess Championship
|-
|  || 3.1 || Iraqi Chess Federation   || 0 ||  679 || Iraqi Chess Championship
|-
|  || 1.1a || Irish Chess Union    || 1 || 656 || Irish Chess Championship
|-
|  || 1.2b || Israel Chess Federation    || 42 || 2321 || Israeli Chess Championship
|-
|  || 1.1c || Federazione Scacchistica Italiana    || 14 || 9618 || Italian Chess Championship
|-
|  || 4.4 ||  || 0 || 33 || Ivorian Chess Championship
|-
|  || 2.3.5 || Jamaica Chess Federation    || 0 || 233 || Jamaican Chess Championship
|-
|  ||  3.3 ||     || 0 || 206  || Japanese Chess Championship
|-
|  || 1.10 || Jersey Chess Federation    || 0 || 26 || Jersey Chess Championship
|-
|  || 3.1 || Royal Jordanian Chess Federation    || 0 || 495 || Jordanian Chess Championship
|-
|  || 3.4 || Kazakhstan Chess Federation  || 14 || 2162 || Kazakhstani Chess Championship
|-
|  || 4.2 ||   || 0 || 438 || Kenyan Chess Championship
|-
|  || 1.2b || Kosovo Chess Federation  || 0 || 205 || Kosovan Chess Championship
|-
|  || 3.1 || Kuwait Chess Federation || 0 || 111 || Kuwaiti Chess Championship
|-
|  || 3.4 || Chess Federation of the Kyrgyz Republic || 0 || 319 || Kyrgyzstani Chess Championship
|-
|  || 3.3 || Lao Chess Federation || 0 || 16 || Laotian Chess Championship
|-
|  || 1.7 || Latvijas Šaha Federācija 
(previously - Latvijas Šaha Savienība) 
| 11 || 678 || Latvian Chess Championship
|-
|  || 3.1 || Federation Libanaise des Echecs   || 0 || 214 || Lebanese Chess Championship
|-
|  || 4.3 || Chess Federation of Lesotho || 0 || 98 || Lesotho Chess Championship
|-
|  || 4.4 || Liberia Chess Federation || 0 || 13 || Liberian Chess Championship
|-
|  || 4.1 || General Libyan Chess Federation || 0 || 480 || Libyan Chess Championship
|-
|  || 1.10 || Liechtensteiner Schachverband || 0 || 15 || Liechtenstein Chess Championship
|-
|  || 1.7 || Lietuvos šachmatų federacija    || 6 || 1022 || Lithuanian Chess Championship
|-
|  || 1.10 || Federation Luxembourgeoise des Echecs   || 0 || 290 || Luxembourg Chess Championship
|-
|  || 3.3 || Grupo de Xadrez de Macau || 0 || 39 || –
|-
|  || 1.2b || Chess Federation of Macedonia   || 9 || 573 || Macedonian Chess Championship
|-
|  || 4.3 ||  || 0 || 248 || Malagasy Chess Championship
|-
|  || 4.3 || Chess Association of Malawi   || 0 || 177 || Malawian Chess Championship
|-
|  || 3.3 || Malaysian Chess Federation    || 0 || 1573 || Malaysian Chess Championship
|-
|  || 3.2 || Maldives Chess Federation || 0 || 34 || Maldivian Chess Championship
|-
|  || 4.1 ||  || 0 || 10 || Malian Chess Championship
|-
|  || 1.10 || Il-Federazzjoni Maltija tac-Cess    || 0 || 142 || Maltese Chess Championship
|-
|  || 4.1 ||   || 0 || 70 || Mauritanian Chess Championship
|-
|  || 4.3 ||   || 0 || 27 || Mauritian Chess Championship
|-
|  || 2.3.1 || Fed. Nac. de Ajedrez de Mexico AC   || 3 || 1818 || Mexican Chess Championship 
|-
|  || 1.8 ||  Federația de Șah a Republicii Moldova   || 7 || 618 || Moldovan Chess Championship
|-
|  || 1.10 ||  || 3 || 69 || Monaco Chess Championship
|-
|  || 3.3 || Mongolian Chess Federation  || 4 || 530 || Mongolian Chess Championship
|-
|  || 1.5a || Montenegro Chess Federation     || 6 || 404 || Montenegrin Chess Championship
|-
|  || 4.1 || Fed. Royale Marocaine des Echecs    || 1 || 344 || Moroccan Chess Championship
|-
|  || 4.3 ||  || 0 || 58 || Mozambican Chess Championship
|-
|  || 3.3 || Myanmar Chess Federation    || 0 || 647 || Myanmar Chess Championship
|-
|  || 4.3 || Namibia Chess Federation  || 0 || 61 || Namibian Chess Championship
|-
|  || 3.6 || Nauru Chess Federation || 0 || 8 || Nauruan Chess Championship
|-
|  || 3.2 || Nepal Chess Association   || 0 || 724 || Nepalese Chess Championship
|-
|  || 1.1b || Koninklijke Nederlandse Schaakbond    || 35 || 4128 || Dutch Chess Championship
|-
|  || 2.3.5 || Curaçao Chess Federation || 0 || 44 || Netherlands Antilles Chess Championship
|-
|  || 3.6 || New Zealand Chess Federation   || 1 || 446 || New Zealand Chess Championship
|-
|  || 2.3.2 || Federacion Nicaragüense de Ajedrez   || 0 || 361 || Nicaraguan Chess Championship
|-
|  || 4.4 || Nigeria Chess Federation   || 0 || 307 || Nigerian Chess Championship
|-
|  || 1.3 || Norges Sjakkforbund    || 16 || 3025 || Norwegian Chess Championship
|-
|  || 3.1 || Oman Chess Committee   || 0 || 82 || Omani Chess Championship
|-
|  || 3.2 || Chess Federation of Pakistan    || 0 || 120 || Pakistani Chess Championship
|-
|  || 3.6 || Palau Chess Federation   || 0 || 112 || Palauan Chess Championship
|-
|  || 3.1 || Palestine Chess Federation  || 0 || 183 || Palestinian Chess Championship
|-
|  || 2.3.2 || Fed. de Ajedrez de Panama   || 0 || 246 || Panamanian Chess Championship
|-
|  || 3.6 || Papua New Guinea Chess Federation || 0 || 10 || Papua New Guinean Chess Championship
|-
|  || 2.5 || Federacion Paraguaya de Ajedrez    || 4 || 1089 || Paraguayan Chess Championship
|-
|  || 2.4 || Federacion Peruana de Ajedrez     || 8 || 6201 || Peruvian Chess Championship
|-
|  || 3.3 || National Chess Federation of the Philippines  || 14 || 2619 || Philippine Chess Championship
|-
|  || 1.4 || Polish Chess Federation    || 41 || 18,252 || Polish Chess Championship
|-
|  || 1.1c || Federação Portuguesa de Xadrez   || 3 || 5320 || Portuguese Chess Championship
|-
|  || 2.3.5 || Fed. de Ajedrez de Puerto Rico   || 0 || 670 || Puerto Rican Chess Championship
|-
|  || 3.1 || Qatar Chess Association  || 3 || 123 || Qatari Chess Championship
|-
|  || 1.4 || Federatia Romana de Șah   || 21 || 6592 || Romanian Chess Championship
|-
|  || 1.6 || Russian Chess Federation   || 234 || 59,294 || Russian Chess Championship
|-
|  || 4.2 ||   || 0 || 79 || Rwandan Chess Championship
|-
|  || 1.10 || Federazione Sammarinese degli Scacchi   || 0 || 15 || Sammarinese Chess Championship
|-
|  || 4.4 ||  || 0 || 18 || São Tomé and Príncipe Chess Championship
|-
|  || 3.1 || Saudi Chess Association  || 0 || 993 || Saudi Arabian Chess Championship
|-
|  || 1.1a || Chess Scotland   || 6 || 708 || Scottish Chess Championship
|-
|  || 4.1 ||  || 0 || 21 || Senegalese Chess Championship
|-
|  || 1.5a || Chess Federation of Serbia    || 55 || 7732 || Serbian Chess Championship
|-
|  || 4.2 || Seychelles Chess Federation   || 0 || 50 || Seychelles Chess Championship
|-
|  || 4.4 || Sierra Leone Chess Federation || 0 || 14 || Sierra Leonean Chess Championship
|-
|  || 3.3 || Singapore Chess Federation   || 3 || 2377 || Singaporean Chess Championship
|-
|  || 1.4 || Slovensky Sachovy Zvaz    || 10 || 6192 || Slovak Chess Championship
|-
|  || 1.2a || Sahovska Zveza Slovenije    || 12 || 4143 ||  Slovenian Chess Championship
|-
|  || 3.6 || Solomon Islands Chess Federation || 0 || 35 ||  Solomon Island Chess Championship
|-
|  || 4.2 || Somali Chess Federation || 0 || 43 ||  Somali Chess Championship
|-
|  || 4.3 || Chess South Africa   || 1 || 2478 || South African Chess Championship
|-
|  || 3.3 || Korea Chess Federation  || 1 || 752 ||  South Korean Chess Championship
|-
|  || 4.2 || South Sudan Chess Federation || 0 || 74 ||  South Sudanese Chess Championship
|-
|  || 1.1c || Federacion Espanola de Ajedrez   || 47 || 39,632 || Spanish Chess Championship
|-
|  || 3.2 || Chess Federation of Sri Lanka || 0 || 8993 ||  Sri Lankan Chess Championship
|-
|  || 4.2 || Sudan Chess Federation || 0 || 312 ||  Sudanese Chess Championship
|-
|  || 2.3.5 || De Surinaamse Schaakbond  || 0 || 355 ||  Surinamese Chess Championship
|-
|  || 4.3 || Eswatini National Chess Federation || 0 || 63 ||  Swazi Chess Championship
|-
|  || 1.3 || Sveriges Schackförbund    || 21 || 4561 || Swedish Chess Championship
|-
|  || 1.2a || Schweizerischer Schachbund   || 8 || 3685 || Swiss Chess Championship
|-
|  || 3.1 || Syrian Arab Chess Federation || 0 || 801 || Syrian Chess Championship
|-
|  || 3.4 || Federazijai Shakhmati Tajikistan   || 1 || 166 || Tajikistani Chess Championship
|-
|  || 4.2 || Tanzania Chess Association || 0 || 76 ||  Tanzanian Chess Championship
|-
|  || 3.3 || Thailand Chess Association  || 0 || 704 ||  Thai Chess Championship
|-
|  || 3.3 || Federação Xadrez de Timor-Leste || 0 || 58 ||  Timorese Chess Championship
|-
|  || 4.4 ||    || 0 || 95 || Togolese Chess Championship
|-
|  || 2.3.5 || Trinidad and Tobago Chess Association   || 0 || 535 || Trinidad and Tobago Chess Championship
|-
|  || 4.1 ||     || 2 || 941 || Tunisian Chess Championship
|-
|  || 1.5a || Turkish Chess Federation   || 10 || 24,200 || Turkish Chess Championship
|-
|  || 3.4 || Turkmenistan Chess Federation  || 5 || 410 || Turkmen Chess Championship
|-
|  || 4.2 || Uganda Chess Federation   || 0 || 369 || Ugandan Chess Championship
|-
|  || 1.9 || Ukrainian Chess Federation   || 87 || 8713 || Ukrainian Chess Championship
|-
|  || 3.1 || UAE Chess Federation   || 2 || 1949 || Emirati Chess Championship
|-
|  || 2.1 || United States Chess Federation   || 90 || 13,579 || U.S. Chess Championship  U.S. Women's Chess Championship
|-
|  || 2.3.5 || US Virgin Islands Chess Federation   || 0 || 50 || –
|-
|  || 2.5 || Federación Uruguaya de Ajedrez   || 1 || 952 || Uruguayan Chess Championship
|-
|  || 3.4 || Chess Federation of Uzbekistan   || 12 || 1073 || Uzbekistani Chess Championship
|-
|  || 2.3.5 || Fed. Venezolana de Ajedrez  || 1 || 4700 ||  Venezuelan Chess Championship
|-
|  || 3.3 || Vietnam Chess Federation   || 9 || 1855 || Vietnamese Chess Championship 
|-
|  || 1.1a || Welsh Chess Union   || 1 || 475 || Welsh Chess Championship
|-
|  || 3.1 || Yemen Chess Association   || 0 || 280 || Yemeni Chess Championship
|-
|  || 4.3 || Chess Federation of Zambia || 1 || 893 || Zambian Chess Championship
|-
|  || 4.3 || Zimbabwe Chess Federation  || 0 || 433 || Zimbabwean Chess Championship
|}

Former FIDE members
The list below includes nations that no longer exist as well as national federations that are currently not members of FIDE.
{| class="sortable wikitable"
! Country !! National federation !! National championship
|-
|  || Belize Chess Federation  || Belizean Chess Championship
|-
|  || || Czechoslovak Chess Championship
|-
|  || USSR Chess Federation || USSR Chess Championship
|-
|  || || Yugoslav Chess Championship
|-
|}

Supranational level
{| class="sortable wikitable"
! Countries (zone) !! Federation !! Official Website !! Championships
|-
| Europe (1) || European Chess Union (ECU)  || http://www.europechess.org || Individual, Youth, Junior,  Senior and Team
|-
| America (2) ||  Confederation of Chess for America (CCA) || http://www.fideamerica.com || Pan American Chess Championship
|-
| Asia (3) || Asian Chess Federation (ACF)  || http://www.asianchess.com || Asian Chess Championship, Asian Senior Chess Championship
|-
| Africa (4) ||  African Chess Confederation (ACC)  || http://africa-chess.org || African Chess Championship
|-
| Arab world || Arab Chess Federation (ACF) || http://www.arabfide.com || Arab Chess Championship
|-
| ASEAN || ASEAN Chess Confederation || http://aseanchess.org/ || –
|-
| Commonwealth of Nations ||  Commonwealth Chess Association (CCA)   || http://www.commonwealthchess.com || Commonwealth Chess Championship
|-
| European microstates || – || – || European Small Nations Chess Championship
|-
| Francophone countries || International Chess Federation of French-speaking countries (AIDEF) || https://web.archive.org/web/20170809133711/http://aidef.ffechecs.org/ || AIDEF Chess Championship
|-
| Ibero-America || Iberoamerican Chess Federation (FIBDA) || http://www.fibda.com || Iberoamerican Chess Championship
|-
| Mediterranean countries || Mediterranean Chess Association || http://www.medchess.org || Mediterranean Chess Championship
|-
| Nordic countries || Nordic Chess Federation || http://www.sjakk.no/nordisk/  || Nordic Chess Championship
|-
| Oceania (3.6) || Oceania Chess Confederation (OCC) || http://www.oceaniachess.com/ || Oceania Chess Championship
|-
| South America || - || - || South American Chess Championship
|}

References

Chess organizations
Geography
Chess-related lists
Human geography